The Mylo Xyloto Tour was the fifth concert tour undertaken by British rock band Coldplay. It was announced in support of their fifth album, Mylo Xyloto (2011), and began on 3 December 2011 at Scotland's SEC Centre, following a series of promotional shows which included performances at festivals such as Austin City Limits, Glastonbury, Lollapalooza, and Rock in Rio. According to Pollstar, the band have grossed $192.5 million from 2.27 million tickets sold in 2011 and 2012.

Background
After devoting the summer of 2011 to a promotional tour in Europe, the Americas and Africa, the band announced the tour via their Twitter account in September 2011. Initial dates revealed shows in the UK, France, Germany and Belgium. A set of rehearsal shows were added for October and November, seeing the band partake in radio festivals and fan-exclusive gigs. Due to the demand, the band added additional shows in the UK. One of those dates is a concert at Dingwalls in London. Here, the band played several shows to help finance their debut album. Later in November, more dates were added in the UK, this time, playing stadiums in June 2012. The shows in Coventry, Manchester, Sunderland and London sold out in under two hours. The tour kicked off with a live-streamed concert in Madrid. Each member of the band received £10.2 million after tax from the £118.4 million made.

Broadcasts and recordings
Prior to the tour the band made a promotional concert in Madrid which was streamed live on YouTube. Entitled, "Coldplay Live: Unstaged", the band performed songs from Mylo Xyloto alongside their previous hits. The concert aired on 26 October 2011. The show was not only streamed on YouTube but also in Times Square. Internet users were able to view exclusive content including a pre-show interview and footage from the band's soundcheck. Viewers were also able to select their camera view, spanning from "front of stage" to "aerial". The show was directed by Anton Corbijn and presented by American Express. The live webcast is reported to have been viewed by nearly 20 million viewers. Replay of the show on Vevo was viewed by nearly 8 million viewers.

The 1 June concert at the Emirates Stadium was broadcast on Absolute Radio. Known as "Coldplay: Live at the Emirates", the full show was aired live and uninterrupted. Before the program aired, DJ Geoff Lloyd hosted a special entities, "Coldplay Hometime Special". The set featured interviews with the bandmembers, alongside the band's hits. A live album and concert film, entitled Coldplay Live 2012, were released in 2012. Two associated EPs, iTunes Festival: London 2011 and Live in Madrid were released on 18 September 2011 and 31 October 2011, respectively.

Set list

{{hidden
| headercss = background: #CCCCFF; font-size: 100%; width: 100%;
| contentcss = text-align: left; font-size: 100%; width: 100%;
| header = 2012 Summer Paralympics‚ London, Great Britain
| content =
"Us Against the World"
"Yellow"
"Up in Flames"
"Paradise"
"42"
"God Put a Smile upon Your Face" (with Mat Fraser)
"Clocks"
"Charlie Brown"
"Princess of China" (with Rihanna)
"Strawberry Swing"
"We Found Love" (with Rihanna)
"Viva la Vida"
Encore
"Run This Town" (with Jay-Z & Rihanna)
"Paradise" (Reprise) (with Jay-Z)
"The Scientist"
"M.M.I.X."
"Every Teardrop Is a Waterfall"
}}

Tour dates

Cancelled shows

Personnel
Credits taken from the band's official tour book, which was sold exclusively on merchandise booths and their online store.

Performing members
 Chris Martin – lead vocals, piano, rhythm guitar
 Jonny Buckland – lead guitar, backing vocals, keyboards
 Guy Berryman – bass, backing vocals, keyboards, percussion
 Will Champion – drums, backing vocals, percussion

Main crew
 Dave Holmes – manager
 Phil Harvey – creative director
 Marguerite Nguyen – tour manager
 Arlene Moon, Mandi Bursteen, Aziyn Babayan – 3D Management
 EJ McDonald, Jessie Collins – artist assistants
 Dan Green – sound engineer and producer
 Miller – Pro Tools and website
 Rik Simpson – record engineer and producer

Production
 Bill Leabody – production manager
 Steve Iredale – stadium site coordinator
 Craig Finley – stage manager
 Nicole Erin Kuhns – production coordinator
 Tiffany Henry – wardrobe

Backline
 Matt McGinn – guitar tech
 Craig Hope – guitar tech
 Sean Buttery – drum tech
 Neil Lambert – keys and digital tech
 Paul Newman – bass tech

Sound
 Chris Wood – monitor engineer
 Tony Smith – FoH assistant
 Nick Davis – monitor assistant
 Ali Viles – RF tech

Sound crew
 Sid Rogerson (chief)
 Kyle Walsh (chief)
 Nick Mooney
 Conor Dunne
 Josh de Jong
 Craig Gordon
 Matt Latham
 John Switzer
 Victor Arko
 Jordan Kolenc
 Kurt Wolf

Lighting crew
 Mick Stowe (chief)
 Graham Feast (operator)
 Phil Sharp
 Ricky Butler
 Kris Lundberg
 Wayne Kwiat
 Marta Iwan
 John Bailey
 Gareth Pritchard
 Paul Burke
 Ben Rogerson
 Mark Goodwall

Video crew
 Andy Bramley (diretor)
 Ed Jarman (engieer)
 Ben Miles (media servers)
 Phil Johnston
 Pieter Laleman
 Sacha Moore
 Robyn Tearle
 Chip Wood

Rigging crew
 Russell Glenn (head rigger)
 Jerry Hough (coordinator)
 Bjorn Melchert
 Matt Rynes

Carpenters
 Pat Boyd
 Mike Humeniuk
 Andy Pearson

Special effects
 David Kennedy – laser and pyro design
 Mike Hartle – lasers
 John Lyons – pyro
 Derek Purciful – confetti

Security
 Andy Frost, Kelly Samuels – artist security
 Jackie Jackson – venue security

Stage
 Paul Normandale – lighting and production designer
 Misty Buckley – stage and prop design
 Paris, Reggie Matherson, Lynden Mallinson – instrument and stage painting

Trainer
 Dan Portanier

Catering
 Soozie Coll
 Alicia Boardman
 Pauline Austin
 Jesse Davies
 Piers Dawson
 Sharon Jackson

Stadium dressing rooms
 Dave Loudon
 Ian Thomason

Representatives
 Hal Hamer, Dan Vitt – merchandise (North America)
 Paul Nolan – merchandise (Europe)
 Julie Matway – Live Nation
 Rachel Edwards – Oxfam
 Gavin Maude, Jonathan Petch – legal

VIP ticketing coordinator
 Tiffany Hiliard
 Arman Chaparyan

Xylobands
 Jason Regler
 Hillside Design

Accounting
 Alex Pollock – tour accountant
 Dales Evans, Lester Dales, Paul Making – band accountant

US Accounting
 David Weise & Co.
 Sue Davidian
 Diana de La Cerda
 Laurie Wolf

UK Accounting
 Headlong Tours LLP
 Dale Evans & Co. Ltd.
 Lester Dales
 Paul Makin
 Tracy Lawson
 Debbie Johnson

Booking agents
 Steve Strange, Josh Javor – X-Ray Touring (UK)
 Marty Diamond, Larry Webman – Paradigm (US)

Record company
 Parlophone – UK
 EMI Music – US
 Kevin Brown, Rob Wood – ROW

Suppliers
 Champman Freeborn Airchartering – aircraft charter
 Beat the Street, Senators Coaches – bussing
 Eat to the Beat – catering
 Cube Services Inc. – credentials
 Global Motion Ltd. – freight
 Moorcrofts of London – UK ground transport
 Daitz Personal Logistics LLC – US ground transport
 Stars and Cars – Europe ground transport
 Robertson Taylor Inc. – insurance
 The Factory – itinerary books
 Lite Alternative Ltd., Upstaging Radios, Road Radios – lighting
 Celebrity Protection, Keleca Associates – security
 Brilliant Stages, Hangman Ltd., Specialz Ltd., Air Artists – set construction
 Strictly FX Inc. – special effects
 All Access – staging
 Wigwam Acoustics, 8th Day Sound – sound
 XL Video – video
 Stagetruck Ltd., Upstaging – trucking
 The Appointment Group – UK travel
 Altour – US travel
 The Event Safety Shop – health and safety

Website
 Brian Schulmeister, Wendy Marvel – design
 Chris Salmon – editor
 Debs Wild – ambassador

Tour book
 Wendy Marvel – design
 Chris Salmon – interviews
 Paris, Coldplay, Tappin Gofton – original album artwork

Tour book production
 Jeremy Joseph
 Dell Furano
 Rick Fish
 Pete Weber
 Tanya Davis
 Emily Theobald
 Kate Stretton

Photos courtesy of
 Miller
 Benjamin Etridge
 Sarah Lee
 Phil Harvey
 Noah Abrams

Gear
Credits taken from Projection, Lights & Staging News, with product quantities being represented between parenthesis whenever possible.

 HES Wholehog 3 Consoles with Wings (2)
 Vari*Lite VL3500 Wash FX Fixtures (34)
 Martin MAC 700 Profiles (28)
 Martin MAC 2000 Wash XBs (13)
 Martin MAC 101s (70)
 Martin MAC 250s (20)
 Martin MAC Viper Profile (1)
 Atomic 3000 Strobes (26)
 Molefay 4-lite Liners (49)
 i-Pix Satellite 2s (36)
 i-Pix BB4s (66)
 Novalight Nova Flowers (6)
 Custom 2K Floor Fixtures with Two iPix BB4s in Each (5)
 Martin MAC 250 Fixtures with Beam Kits (20)
 Wildfire 400W UV-A Fixtures with Irises (3)
 Chauvet UV Shadows (8)
 Robert Juliat 1.2K Lancelot Spots (8)
 Lyceum 2.5K FOH Spots (4)
 Lyceum M2 Long Throw (1)
 Look Solutions Orka Foggers (2)
 Reel EFX DF-50 Diffusion Hazers (2)
 Barco O-lite 5 m Diameter Circular Screen, 10 mm LED (1)
 Barco FLM R22+ DLP Projectors in Custom Frames (10)
 Circular Video Screens for Stadiums with Pixled F-12 (5)
 Catalyst v4 Media Servers (4)
 16x16 Lightware DVI Matrix (1)
 Grass Valley Kayak 2.5M/E Switcher (1)
 Sony HXC-100K Cameras (5)
 AJA Video Systems Ki Pro Recording Units (3)
 Thundering Jacks Video Dust System (1)
 Xylobands (2.3 million)

See also
 List of Coldplay live performances
 List of highest-grossing live music artists

Notes

References

External links

Coldplay Official Website

Coldplay concert tours
2011 concert tours
2012 concert tours
Concert tours of Asia
Concert tours of Europe
Concert tours of North America
Concert tours of Oceania
Concert tours of Australia
Concert tours of Belgium
Concert tours of Canada
Concert tours of Denmark
Concert tours of France
Concert tours of Germany
Concert tours of Ireland
Concert tours of Italy
Concert tours of Japan
Concert tours of the Netherlands
Concert tours of New Zealand
Concert tours of Portugal
Concert tours of Spain
Concert tours of South Africa
Concert tours of Sweden
Concert tours of Switzerland
Concert tours of the United Kingdom
Concert tours of the United States